The 2011 Oyo State gubernatorial election was the 7th gubernatorial election of Oyo State. Held on April 26, 2011, the Action Congress of Nigeria nominee Abiola Ajimobi won the election, defeating Christopher Alao-Akala of the People's Democratic Party.

Results 
A total of 15 candidates contested in the election. Abiola Ajimobi from the Action Congress of Nigeria won the election, defeating Christopher Alao-Akala from the People's Democratic Party. Registered voters was 2,651,842, valid votes was 1,125,090.

References 

Oyo State gubernatorial elections
Oyo gubernatorial
April 2011 events in Nigeria